Buick Estate is a nameplate that was used by the Buick division of General Motors, denoting its luxury full-size station wagon from 1940 to 1964 and from 1970 to 1996.  The Estate nameplate was derived from the term  country estate in wealthy suburban areas and estate car, the British term for a station wagon.

For much of its model life the Buick Estate was produced using GM B platform as the station wagon counterpart of Buick sedans; it was offered on the GM C platform from 1949–1953, then again from 1971–1976. With the exception of the prewar Buick Limited limousine, the Estate was the largest vehicle of the Buick line, combining the luxury features of Buick sedans with cargo-carrying capabilities.  In line with other brands having a wagon-associated moniker, Estate became adopted by other Buick wagons (regardless of size), with the exceptions of the 1964–1972 Buick Sport Wagon and the 1982–1989 Buick Skyhawk station wagon.

Starting with model year 1947 until 1964, the Estate was offered as a station wagon on two model lines. When it returned in 1970, it was the senior station wagon to the Sport Wagon, then the name was again used on two different models in 1973 when the Sport Wagon was replaced with the intermediate-sized Buick Century Estate.

As the Cadillac Division did not offer a factory-produced station wagon in North America until 2010 (the Cadillac CTS Sport Wagon), the Buick Estate served as the flagship station wagon entry from General Motors, slotted slightly above its Oldsmobile divisional counterpart, the Oldsmobile Custom Cruiser beginning in 1971.  Competing against the Chrysler Town & Country and the Mercury Colony Park, the Estate was originally produced as a wooden-body station wagon ("woodie"); from 1970 to 1996, nearly all examples were fitted with simulated woodgrain exterior trim (though technically optional).  The 1996 Buick Roadmaster Estate (alongside its Chevrolet Caprice counterpart) was the full-size station wagon to remain in production and the last to offer exterior woodgrain trim. In 1976 American Motors Corporation introduced the Jeep Grand Wagoneer with similar passenger accommodation, luxury standard equipment and a simulated woodgrain appearance built on a dedicated chassis.

Following the 1996 model year, Buick discontinued the Roadmaster Estate and mid-size Century Estate station wagons, ending the use of the nameplate.  Buick would not market another station wagon in the United States until 2018, rebranding the Opel Insignia as the Buick Regal TourX.

1940s

The first Buick Estate station wagon was a large-bodied  wheelbase GM C platform Buick Super introduced mid-year only for 1940 with a wooden body, the same year the wooden-body station wagon Packard One-Ten was first introduced. The 1940 Super Estate was very exclusive, and was installed with the second largest engine offered at the time, with a retail price of US$1,242 ($ in  dollars ) while the limousine Buick Limited manufactured 1,739 for a listed retail price of US$2,199 ($ in  dollars ) with similar length and interior comfort. The appearance of the wood panels using both mahogany panels with oak trim was different from other wagons that used one source of wood. Production totals record that 495 found buyers at the same time the 4-door Touring Sedan sold 95,875 and 4,764 convertible coupes were made. Earlier in 1934 a two-door shooting brake was offered on the Buick Series 50 by special request. In 1942 all GM vehicles had an appearance upgrade where the trailing edge of the front fender was extended across the front doors that was called "Airfoil" accented by parallel chrome strips on the front and rear fenders on Buick vehicles. In later years the character line of the "Airfoil" feature was accented with a stainless steel strip that evolved into the Buick Sweepspear for several decades.

The introduction of a station wagon was a novel body style as GM first introduced it in 1939 for the Chevrolet Master, 1940 for the Oldsmobile Series 60 and 1937 for the Pontiac Streamliner and all used wooden body panels for the passenger compartment. 1935 was the year the Chevrolet Suburban carryall/panel truck was built with an all-steel body on a truck-based chassis and offered a choice of side-hinged rear panel doors, or a rear tailgate/lift window could be selected for cargo area access while only offering two side mounted doors, resembling a cargo van that could seat up to eight passengers. 1937 was also the year Packard first offered a station wagon on the junior series Packard Six Model 115-C. Buick and Packard had a professional rivalry and the introduction of the Packard Station Wagon was an opportunity Buick leadership saw an opportunity to offer one for Buick. In 1946 the Willys Jeep Station Wagon was introduced with a similar passenger accommodation and load carrying capability.

For 1941 and 1942, Buick switched to the GM B platform Special continuing to offer the  wheelbase while the Oldsmobile Series 60 continued to use the shortest A-body. 1940 is also the year the station wagon returned to Packard on the luxurious Packard One-Twenty which also had a   wheelbase. The retail price for the Special Estate was US$1,463 ($ in  dollars ) and a similar production total of 838 were produced, while the Touring Sedan made 91,138. In 1941 the Chrysler Windsor Town & Country station wagon was introduced shortly thereafter.

Later after automobile production resumed at the end of World War II, the Estate returned to Buick's C platform Super and Roadmaster for the 1946–49 model years and a long tradition of contracting the station wagon body style was provided by Ionia Manufacturing, also known as Mitchell-Bentley Corporation that today is called, Mitchell Corporation, which built all Buick station wagon bodies between 1946 and 1964 instead of GM's Fisher Body. 

The 1946 Super Estate was listed at US$2,594 ($ in  dollars ) and production total of 786 were produced while still offering the  wheelbase. Packard didn't offer a competitive appearance station wagon until 1948 with the Packard Station Sedan.

For model year 1947, the Estate Station Wagon body style was offered on both the Super and Roadmaster models, with the Super being the more modestly equipped and the Roadmaster being the luxury version, while both offered the wooden body panels.

1950s

The 1950 through 1953 Estate continued using the Super and Roadmaster "C" platform, then in 1954 to 1958 it was offered on the shorter B platform Century and Special, with all steel bodies, shared with the Oldsmobile 88.

Due to the high maintenance required of the genuine wood veneer panels requiring a coat of varnish to keep the durability and appearance, the use of wood gradually decreased until 1950 when it was not much more than window surround for the exterior while more modestly used inside where the wood was protected from the elements. The Estate for 1950 was offered on the Super and Roadmaster, while the Roadmaster was offered with two trim packages called Model 79 Estate Wagon and the Model 79R Deluxe Estate Wagon, the latter offering leather upholstery, a carpeted cargo area and the first time power windows and power adjustable front seat were available. 

It was installed with the largest engine available in the top-level Roadmaster, which was the Fireball Straight-eight engine that necessitated the long  wheelbase. Production numbers for both continued to be modest, with the Super Estate manufacturing 2,480 in comparison to 114,745 Super Riviera Sedan, with a listed retail price of US$2,480 ($ in  dollars ) while the Roadmaster Estate and Roadmaster Deluxe Estate had a combined production of 420 and a listed retail price of US$3,433 ($ in  dollars ) making the Deluxe Estate the most expensive Buick for that year.

Production numbers of the Estate had remained small since it was introduced, and Buick changed the platform used a few times in an attempt to stimulate sales, and in 1955 the Estate had its most popular year with a combined total of 7,195, with the breakdown of 2,952 Special Estate with the last year of the  Fireball Straight-eight engine at a listed retail price of US$2,974 ($ in  dollars ) and 4,243 for the Century Special and US$3,175 ($ in  dollars ), installing the all-new  Fireball V8. "Cordaveen" upholstery began to be installed in various configurations beginning in the mid-1950s with cloth inserts on higher trim packages.

Later during the 50s, the fashionable hardtop body style was introduced on the Century Caballero Estate Wagons that were offered only in 1957 and 1958 and was shared with the Oldsmobile 88 Fiesta hardtop station wagon. The hardtop feature was also offered on the Special Riviera Estate Wagon and sold 6,817 with a listed retail price of US$3,167 ($ in  dollars ), while the Century Caballero Estate Wagon sold 10,186 with a listed retail price of US$3,706 ($ in  dollars ), leading in sales against the Chrysler New Yorker Town & Country and Mercury Colony Park.

1960s

In 1959 the LeSabre Estate was introduced on the B platform. Beginning in 1959 the intermediate Invicta Estate was offered with a listed retail price of US$3,841 ($ in  dollars ) while the junior LeSabre station wagon was listed at US$3,320 ($ in  dollars ).

The Estate station wagons received a "Cordaveen" vinyl interior as standard, with the Saran Balfour cloth/Cordaveen combination interior available as an option in several colors.  Engines were unchanged from previous years including the standard 250-horsepower 364-cubic-inch V8, no-cost regular fuel 235-horsepower 364 or the four-barrel 300-horsepower option of same engine available at extra cost. The two-speed Turbine Drive Dynaflow automatic transmission was standard equipment on LeSabres and all other full-sized Buicks this year, although a manual transmission was also available. The three Ventiports returned to the side of the front fender denoting the junior-level status in Buick's hierarchy of products offered.

The LeSabre Estate Wagon came standard with the larger 325-horsepower 401 V8 from the Wildcat and Electra 225 models.  Replacing the old Dynaflow-based two-speed automatic transmission were two new Super Turbine automatics. The two-speed Super Turbine 300 (shared with the intermediate-sized cars) was available with the standard two-barrel 300 V8 while the three-speed Super Turbine 400 (shared with other big Buicks and Rivieras) was standard with the 300 four-barrel and optional with the standard engine as well as the 401 in the Estate Wagon. The standard transmission with the base 300 two-barrel V8 was a three-speed column shift manual and a four-speed manual was available as an option with either engine. The new ST300 transmission carried over the variable pitch torque converter from the Dynaflow that had been used since the mid-1950s, while the first year for the ST400 featured a fixed-pitch converter.  Inside, only minor trim/upholstery revisions were made.

For 1963, the Invicta series had a 6-passenger station wagon as its sole model. Only 3,495 Invicta Estate station wagons were built for 1963, after which the name disappeared, when it was replaced by the Buick Wildcat hardtop coupe or sedan. The Estate Wagon was replaced by the new, smaller A platform Buick Sport Wagon, making the B-body Chevrolet Impala Estate and Pontiac Safari the only full-sized GM station wagons until 1970.

1970

The Buick Estate Wagon was re-introduced as the top-level luxury station wagon for GM in 1970 to compete against the Mercury Colony Park and Chrysler New Yorker Town & Country. Buick's first full-sized station wagon since 1964, it was available as a separate series on the B-body LeSabre chassis, sharing their  wheelbase, basic body and interior and took the senior position above the Buick Sport Wagon mid-sized station wagon. From 1967 until the Estate returned in 1970, GM's most upscale full-sized station wagon offering simulated woodgrained paneling was the Pontiac Executive Safari station wagon and Chevrolet Caprice Custom Estate. By special request from coachbuilders like ASC and  Traditional Coachworks of Chatsworth, California the Cadillac Fleetwood was modified as a station wagon after the donor vehicle was completed.

The Estate returned to an earlier tradition during the 1940s and 1950s of positioning it as a luxury vehicle similar to the top-level Electra 225, with full power amenities, air conditioning and the available AM/FM radio, and included an optional roof installed luggage rack with a vinyl roof covering available. To accommodate various load duties, the second row bench seat had a 60/40 split for additional passengers and cargo while using the Buick 455 V8 for effortless driving. The listed retail price was US$5,047 ($ in  dollars ) and 28,306 were manufactured

The LeSabre Custom's bright rocker, wheelhouse and rear lower fender moldings were used. Reviving a late 1940s "woodie" appearance Woodgrain using DI-NOC a vinyl wood-grained wrap was an option for the body sides, incorporating the traditional "Sweepspear" feature. Interiors were "Cordaveen" in the more upscale Custom trim package. Despite being on the B-body it shared the C-body division flagship Electra's luxurious accommodations and standard equipment and four VentiPorts on the front fenders. The following year the Estate would move up to Electra's larger body and more voluminous interior.

Adopting the interior layout of the intermediate Sport Wagon, the Estate used a forward-facing third-row seat, and access to the third row was accomplished by a second row split bench seat that retracted forward. With a total of eight-passenger accommodation (similar to the Chevrolet/GMC Suburban of the time), the first-generation Estate wagon was among the largest vehicles ever built by Buick.

1971–1976

The 1971 to 1976 Estates were the first Buick station wagons to be built on GM longest chassis since the Roadmaster Estates of 1947–53. The Estate shared its  C-body wheelbase with the Electra 225, while all 1971–76 GM wagons were B-body-based per model numbers. The 1971–76 GM full-size bodies, at  front shoulder room and  rear shoulder room set a record for interior width that would not be matched by any car until the full-size GM rear-wheel drive models of the early to mid 1990s. The Estate also shared the Electra 225's interior and exterior styling from 1971 to 1974 (complete with the prerequisite four VentiPorts). Door trim and seats were not as plush in 1971–74 wagons and no door pull strap was included as it was on the Electra.

Although from 1975 to 1976 the number of VentiPorts were reduced by one, and the front fascia was downgraded to a LeSabre's (as was door trim and seats), the Electra 225 style chrome rocker panel moldings and distinctive Electra 225 style rear quarter panels (albeit without fender skirts) remained. The taillights were different from both the LeSabre and the Electra in all of these years. The Estate Wagons, as with other GM full-sized wagons during these years, used a rear suspension with multi-leaf springs instead of the coil springs used on other full-sized Buicks, and other full-sized GM cars to better cope with load carrying duties.

The Estate Wagons also featured a new 'clamshell' tailgate design, marketed as the Glide-away Tailgate, where the rear power-operated glass slid up into the roof as the lower tailgate (manually or with power assist), slid into a recess under the cargo floor. Ultimately, the manual lower tailgate was supplanted by the power tailgate. The tailgate system was operated by switches on the instrument panel or a key switch on the rear quarter panel. Like a top-hinged tailgate, the clamshell design allowed a user to stand directly at the open cargo area without impediment, facilitating loading and unloading in tight spaces. the rear seat could be folded flat for additional cargo, and incorporated a 60/40 split so that extended cargo and passengers could be accommodated, and providing entry to the third row seat. Cargo capacity with the second row seats folded was 184 cubic feet. If passengers were seated in the optional forward facing third row seat, the rear window could be retracted into the roof while the vehicle was in motion with the tailgate in place.

In its first year, 24,034 Estate Wagons were sold with a listed retail price of US$5,414 ($ in  dollars ).

At  shipping weight, or about  curb weight, the three-seat 1974 Estate Wagons are easily the heaviest Buicks ever built, even heavier than the Buick Limited limousines of 1936–42. The 1975 and 1976 models were the longest station wagons ever built.

The Estate used the Buick 455 V8 from 1971 through 1976 found in the Buick GSX. The Stage One high performance version, with high lift camshaft, enlarged ports, enlarged valves, and dual exhaust, was available as an option through 1974.

To commemorate the Bicentennial of the United States, the standard colors available on all Buicks were Judicial Black, Liberty White, Pewter Gray, Potomac Blue, Continental Blue, Concord Green, Constitution Green, Mount Vernon Cream, Buckskin Tan, Musket Brown, Boston Red and Independence Red, with specially available colors on select models Congressional Cream, Revere Red, Colonial Yellow and Firecracker Orange.

1977–1990

In 1977, the Buick Estate was downsized and relaunched on General Motors' B-body.  In 1979, an Estate Wagon Limited was offered with many previously extra cost options now included as standard in addition to the Estate Wagon.  To further differentiate the Limited model, fenders included four VentiPorts (up from three) and the interior had velour upholstery with loose pillow designed seating or vinyl with leather available in later years. Production records show 21,312 were built for 1979. An appearance change was introduced for the simulated woodgrain changing from mahogany to oak which was used for several decades. Cargo capacity with the second row seats in place was 87.9 cubic feet and the core chassis elements remained in use until 1996 when the GM station wagon production was terminated. When the Estate Wagon was introduced it had a shorter wheelbase than the 1964 Buick Sport Wagon.

The tradition of luxury continued with power windows, power adjustable drivers split bench seat, six speaker stereo system, dual power adjustable side view mirrors, Touch Climate Control air conditioning, GM's Twilight Sentinel automatic headlight activation and other luxury features found on the Buick Electra. The 1977 listed retail price was $6,078 ($ in  dollars ) with the optional rear facing third row seat, while the "Dual-Action" tailgate was now standard equipment with a power retractable rear window on all GM station wagons.

In 1980, body changes made the wagon more aerodynamic for better fuel efficiency.  Also that year, the Electra Estate Wagon was introduced and replaced the Estate Wagon Limited while the 'base' model was now called LeSabre Estate Wagon.  Exterior woodgrain applique was standard on the Electra Estate (but could be deleted for credit) and optional on the LeSabre Estate.  The Buick 350 V8 engine was dropped from the options list and a 5.7 litre diesel 350 V8 was now available through 1985.  The standard engine was the 5.0 litre Oldsmobile 307 V8.

Although the Electra and LeSabre coupes and sedans had both switched to new front wheel drive platforms by 1986, the model names also continued to be used on the rear wheel drive wagons through 1989 making the Estate the largest rear wheel drive Buick offered.

For 1990, which would be the Estate's final year, the Electra and LeSabre model designations were dropped and the car was once again sold simply as the Estate Wagon.  As with the Electra Estate in previous years, standard exterior woodgrain could be deleted for credit. Although the Estate Wagon model was discontinued in 1990, the Estate trim designation continued on the full-size Roadmaster station wagons from 1991 to 1996.  The Estate name was also applied to the top trim level of the mid-size Century station wagon (sold as the Regal Estate station wagon in 1982 and 1983) and often included exterior woodgrain applique.  Like the Roadmaster, the Century Estate continued to be sold through 1996.

Production Figures

1991–1996

Buick revived the Roadmaster name with the introduction of the Roadmaster Estate in 1991 not used since 1953. A "Vista Roof" fixed sunroof over the second row seats, was standard, revived from the 1960s Buick Sport Wagon. Initially the Roadmaster Estate used Chevrolet's 5.0 L L03 V8.  It was replaced a year later with a 180 hp 5.7L small-block L05 V8 shared by both wagon and sedan. In 1994 both received a modified dual-exhaust version of the advanced Corvette-derived 5.7L sequential point fuel-injection LT1 V8, increasing output to 260 hp and upping performance substantially.  The same engine was used on the Impala SS, Chevrolet police interceptors, and the Cadillac Fleetwood, with an aluminum head version on the Corvette C4, Camaro Z-28, and Firebird Trans-AM. A high-performance engine had last been offered on a GM station wagon in 1974. The listed retail price was $21,445 ($ in  dollars ) before optional equipment was added.

Due to engineering challenges the rear tailgate remained as a swing-away or tailgate to accommodate rear passengers in the optional third row rear facing seat but the glass panel was now hinged at the top instead of retracting into the tailgate assembly which was an approach last used in 1957, and it showed a similar semi-fastback appearance of the 1971–1976 "clamshell" generation. To compensate for the lack of rear ventilation vent windows once again appeared but were only installed at the edge of the rear cargo windows and instead of an integrated wind deflector which in previous generations helped to clear the rear window a rear wiper and washer system was installed as standard equipment.

When ordered with the factory towing package, the station wagon could accommodate  with the use of a weight-distributing hitch, dual sway controls, setting rear tire pressure to 35 PSI, and disabling the Electronic Level Control. The towing package added 2.93 rear-axle gears and a rear limited-slip differential, heavy-duty cooling system including oil and transmission coolers, and a factory-installed self-leveling rear suspension called Dynaride, which consisting of air shocks, a height sensor between the rear axle and body and an on-board air compressor. Most visibly, a pair of electric fans offset to the left under the hood was replaced by the combination of one conventional fan-driven mechanically from the engine alongside one electric fan.

GM discontinued the Roadmaster Estate in 1996, ending production on December 13 of that year, which was the last full-sized American station wagon tradition for the industry. All 1996 Roadmaster Estates were installed with a "Collectors Edition" hood ornament, a round medallion in place of the traditional tri-shield Buick badge.

Notes

Sources
 Flory, J. "Kelly", Jr. American Cars 1960–1972. Jefferson, NC: McFarland & Coy, 2004.

Estate
Rear-wheel-drive vehicles
Station wagons
1970s cars
1980s cars
1990s cars
Cars introduced in 1970
Motor vehicles manufactured in the United States